Juris Silovs (30 August 1950 – 28 September 2018) was a Latvian athlete from Krāslava who competed for Soviet Union from 1970 til 1978, mainly in the 100 metres. He trained at the VSS Vārpa in Riga.

Sports career 
Silovs competed for the USSR in the 1972 Summer Olympics held in Munich in the 4 x 100 metre relay, where he won the silver medal with his teammates Aleksandr Kornelyuk, Vladimir Lovetskiy and Valeriy Borzov. He returned for the 1976 Summer Olympics held in Montreal in the 4 x 100 metre relay, where the team won the bronze medal with  Aleksandr Aksinin, Nikolay Kolesnikov and Valeriy Borzov.

Silovs also competed in the 1973 Universiade in Moscow, winning gold in the 100 m event, as well as silver in the 4x100 m relay team event. He also won gold in 1975 and 1977 in the 4x100 m relay event.

He retired due to trauma in 1978, later becoming a catering entrepreneur.

Personal bests

References

External links

1950 births
2018 deaths
People from Krāslava
Soviet male sprinters
Latvian male sprinters
Olympic silver medalists for the Soviet Union
Olympic bronze medalists for the Soviet Union
Athletes (track and field) at the 1972 Summer Olympics
Athletes (track and field) at the 1976 Summer Olympics
Olympic athletes of the Soviet Union
Medalists at the 1976 Summer Olympics
Medalists at the 1972 Summer Olympics
Olympic silver medalists in athletics (track and field)
Olympic bronze medalists in athletics (track and field)
Universiade medalists in athletics (track and field)
Universiade gold medalists for the Soviet Union
Universiade silver medalists for the Soviet Union
Medalists at the 1973 Summer Universiade
Medalists at the 1975 Summer Universiade
Medalists at the 1977 Summer Universiade